Fishing Branch is a  long 2nd order tributary to the Mispillion River in Kent County, Delaware.

Variant names
According to the Geographic Names Information System, it has also been known historically as:  
Fishing Creek

Course
Fishing Branch forms at the confluence of Parnell Branch and Old Baptist Church Branch about 1 mile east of Spring Hill, Delaware.  Fishing Branch then flows southeast to meet the Mispillion River about 1.5 miles southeast of Herrings Corners, Delaware.

Watershed
Fishing Branch drains  of area, receives about 45.5 in/year of precipitation, has a topographic wetness index of 596.10 and is about 8.3% forested.

See also
List of Delaware rivers

References

Rivers of Delaware
Rivers of Kent County, Delaware
Tributaries of Delaware Bay